Sikowitz is a surname. Notable people with the surname include:

Sikowitz (Victorious), a character in the sitcom Victorious
Erin Sikowitz, fictional character in Orange Is the New Black